Ellen Louise Graham is an American journalist and a Pulitzer Prize finalist. She was a writer and editor of The Wall Street Journal from 1971 to 1998. After her retirement, she wrote columns for the Wall Street Journal regarding the challenged that come with retirement. She currently resides in Williamsburg, Virginia.

Awards
Graham continued to write 10 years for the Wall Street Journal. In 1972, she received a Front Page Award for best feature of general interest for the story "A Good Death". Graham, along with Wall Street Journal writer's Chris Adams and Michael Moss, were 1999 Pulitzer Prize finalists in National Reporting. They were nominated "For their reporting on the pitfalls faced by elderly Americans housed in commercial long-term facilities."

Career
Before working for The Wall Street Journal, Graham worked as a researcher for National Geographic Magazine in 1966 to 196 while attending the University of Maryland. Graham started working at the Wall Street Journal in 1971 where she reported, feature wrote, and edited at the paper's New York bureau.

Early life
Graham was born in 1943 in Glendale, California. Graham moved to Maryland during her teenage years where she graduated Bladensburg High School in 1961. During her time at Bladensburg, she was regularly part of a high school youth series "The Teen's Want to Know" where students talked to politicians and other public figures.

Education
From 1961 to 1962 Graham attended Syracuse University. She had no plans to pursue journalism in college until a professor would regularly read Graham's papers aloud to other students. She transferred to the University of Maryland in 1965 and graduated with a degree in journalism in 1968.
She received her master's degree in English Literature and Philosophy at Columbia University Graduate School of Journalism in 1970.

References 

Living people
American women journalists
Editors of New York City newspapers
Syracuse University alumni
University System of Maryland alumni
Columbia University Graduate School of Journalism alumni
People from Williamsburg, Virginia
The Wall Street Journal people
Year of birth missing (living people)